BP Solar was a manufacturer and installer of photovoltaic solar cells headquartered in Madrid, Spain, with production facilities in Frederick, MD, India and the People's Republic of China.  It was a subsidiary of BP.

History
In 1981, BP acquired initially 50% of Lucas Energy Systems which became Lucas BP Solar Systems. The company became wholly owned by BP in the mid-1980s. In 1999, following BP's acquisition of Solarex's majority owner Amoco, it increased its stake in the American Solarex plant to 100%. In that year the company became the world's leading PV producer.

In 2004, the R&D part of BP Solar was sold to the UK's National Renewable Energy Centre (Narec). In 2013, it became Solar Capture Technologies. In 2010, it closed down the factory at Frederick, Maryland. BP Solar was closed on 21 December 2011 when BP announced its departure from the solar energy business.

BP Solar and Indian firm Tata Power established Tata BP Solar, a joint venture company, in 1989. The company began commercial operations in 1991 by establishing its first manufacturing unit with a production capacity of 3 MW in India. BP Solar exited the joint venture in 2012, and Tata BP Solar became a wholly owned subsidiary of the Tata Group.

Operations
PV power plants using BP solar modules include:
 Bürstadt, Germany — 5 MW from 30,000 modules
 Springerville, Arizona, USA — 4.59 MW from 34,980 modules
 Geiseltalsee, Germany — 4 MW from 25,000 modules
 Long Island, New York, USA — 32 MW from 164,312 modules

BP Solar had many projects and co-operative activities in developing countries, including supplying power to 36,000 homes in rural Indonesia, installing 1000 solar devices to provide power to 400 remote villages in the Philippines, and setting up a rural electrification scheme in Malaysia to provide power to 30,000 remote homes in Sabah, Sarawak and Peninsular Malaysia. In the mid-1980s BP installed Solar power for Microwave repeater stations across Sierra Leone in support of a telecommunications network restoration.

BP Solar (with the Commonwealth Scientific and Industrial Research Organisation — CSIRO) was also involved in the commercialization of a long-life deep cycle lead acid battery, which is well suited to the storage of electricity for renewable remote area power systems (RAPS). This GreenGel battery, and CSIRO's new battery charging procedures, will reduce capacity loss and premature failure sometimes encountered with existing battery technology. A significant component of the project will be the establishment of an innovative manufacturing process to enable the production of these advanced batteries at an internationally competitive price, facilitating a major export market.

See also

 Green technology
 List of photovoltaics companies
 Photovoltaic array
 Photovoltaics
 Photovoltaic power stations
 Renewable energy
 Solar power
 Solar shingle
 Solar tracker
 Timeline of solar energy

References

External links
 BP Alternative Energy site (original BP Solar site defunct; redirect)
BP Solar to expand its solar cell plants
Australia's largest city solar project contract awarded
BP Plans to Invest $1.5 Billion in Alternative Energy
Solar Capture Technologies, the company formed from BP Solar UK

Solar energy companies of Europe
Photovoltaics manufacturers
Former BP subsidiaries
Manufacturing companies based in Madrid